Qoi or QOI may refer to:
 QoI or quinone outside inhibitors, a type of fungicide
QOI (image format)
Qoi, Tibet